Constantin Bejenaru (born 7 June 1984) is a Moldovan-born Romanian professional boxer living Shelton Connecticut and training Brooklyn New York, United States. He is currently trained by Ilya Mesishchev. His former coach from Bacău, is Relu Auraş.

Amateur highlights
As an amateur, Bejenaru won the bronze medal at the 2006 European Amateur Boxing Championships in Plovdiv, Bulgaria, multiple medals at the European Union Amateur Boxing Championships and the gold medal at the 2010 World Combat Games.

Professional career
Bejenaru turned pro in 2011, winning the first season edition of Bigger's Better, a boxing tourney under a familiar format of the popular UK Prizefighter series, with all the fights scheduled for three-minute rounds. He rocked through his first tournament in Vilnius, Lithuania, with three easy victories, until to repeat the trick later in the same year in the super final from Croatia.

Titles
2011 Bigger's Better champion
2016 WBC Continental Americas Cruiserweight Champion
2016 WBC Intercontinental Cruiserweight Champion

Professional record

References

External links

World Boxing Council champions
Moldovan male boxers
Living people
1984 births
People from Ungheni
Heavyweight boxers
Romanian expatriates in the United States
Romanian male boxers